The 1st constituency of Jura is a French legislative constituency in the Jura département.

The 1st constituency of Jura covers the south western portion of the department and includes the prefecture Lons-le-Saunier.

Deputies

Election results

2022

2017

2012

References

Sources
 French Interior Ministry results website: 
 

1